La Concepción may refer to:
 La Concepción, Veracruz, Mexico
 La Concepción, Masaya, Nicaragua
 La Concepción, Chiriquí, Panama
 , Venezuela

See also
 Concepción (disambiguation)
 La Purísima Concepción (disambiguation)